Suranna may refer to:

 Nutana-kavi Suranna, 15th-16th century Telugu language poet
 Pingali Suranna, 16th century Telugu language poet